Brecon Corinthians A.F.C. (Brecon Corries) are a Welsh football club from the town of Brecon in Powys. The club played for much of its history in the Welsh Football League, as well as spells in league in South and Mid Wales. They currently play in the Ardal SE, the third tier of the Welsh football pyramid, having secured two successive promotions within the Mid Wales football leagues.

History
The club was formed in 1946 at the Greyhound Coffee Tavern in Llanfaes and were accepted into the Mid Wales League (Southern Section). In 1947–48 they achieved a league-cup double and for the 1949–50 season they joined the Welsh Football League Division Two East Division. The club played in the Welsh Football League until the end of the 1966–67 season when they left to play in the Brecon and District League.  During their first spell in the Welsh Football League their most notable achievement was winning the Welsh Football League Cup in 1962–62, beating Abergavenny Thursdays.

They re-joined the Welsh Football League for the 1974–75 season, playing in Division Two - the third tier of the Welsh football pyramid. At the end of the 1979–80 season, they finished third, gaining promotion to Division One - the second tier.  At the end of the 1981–82 season the club finished as champions gaining promotion to the Premier Division, the top tier of Welsh football. For ten seasons the club played in the top level division until the mid to late 1990's saw the club relegated across a number of seasons, dropping down to tier 4 - the bottom division of the Welsh Football League, with the club leaving the league at the end of the 1998–99 season.

The club then joined the South Wales Senior League but were relegated at the end of their first season from Division One.  They earned promotion from Division Two at the end of 2001–02 season but at the end of the 2004–05 season were relegated again.  In summer of 2006, decisions were made to focus on using local players and former Newtown midfielder Damien Daniel took over as player-manager. The team were promoted at the end of the 2008–09 season after finishing third, but relegated at the end of the following season having finished bottom of the first division. The following season they were again promoted, this time having finished as Division Two runners-up.  At the end of the 2015 season the team transferred to the new South Wales Alliance League Premier Division, at level five of the pyramid. They finished in the top six in each of the new league's opening three seasons, before finishing 9th in their final season in the South Walian league structure.

For the 2019–20 season the club moved within the Welsh football structure to central Wales - and re-joined the Mid Wales South League at tier 5 level. In a season which was curtailed due to the coronavirus pandemic, the club were champions with a 100% record of 16 wins from 16 games with 143 goals scored and just two conceded. having previously played in the South Wales Alliance League. In addition to these statistics the team recorded a 27–0 win at Knighton Town Reserves which was expunged from the record books following Knighton's withdrawal from the league. The club were promoted to the Mid Wales Football League's new East Division at tier 4 for the 2020–21 season, however the season was declared as abandoned without any games played due to the continued impact of the pandemic.  Ahead of the 2021–22 season the club installed covered seating for 100 spectators, a criterion which needs to be met to play at tier 3 of the Welsh football pyramid. The club earned their second league title win in two seasons by securing the East Division title in May 2022.  On 9 June 2022, it was announced that the club had been promoted to the tier 3 Ardal SE League for the 2022–23 season.

Honours

 Mid Wales Football League Play-off – Winners: 2021–22
 Mid Wales League East – Champions (1): 2021–22
 Mid Wales League (Southern Section) - Champions (1): 1947-48
 Mid Wales League Cup – Winners (1): 1947–48
 Welsh League Division Two East - Champions (1): 1954–55
 Welsh Football League Cup - Winners (3): 1962–63; 1981–82; 1991–92
 Gwent Central League Division Two – Champions (1): 1978–79 (reserves)
 Gwent Central League Division Two Cup – Winners (1): 1978–79 (reserves)
 Welsh Football League Division One - Champions (1): 1981–82
 FAW Intermediate Cup – Finalists (2): 1984–85, 1992–93
 Welsh Football League Division One - Runners-up (1): 1992–93
 South Wales Senior League Division Two - Runners-up (2): 2001–02; 2010–11
 Mid Wales League (South) - Champions (1): 2019-20
 J. Emrys Morgan Cup – Winners (1): 2021–22
Central Wales Challenge Cup – Finalists: 2021–22

League history
Information in this section is courtesy of Football Club History Database and the Welsh Soccer Archive.

Notes

Former players
See :Category:Brecon Corinthians F.C. players to see a list of notable Brecon Corries players, past and present.

References

External links
Official Club website
Club official Facebook
 Club official Twitter

Football clubs in Wales
Sport in Powys
South Wales Alliance League clubs
Welsh Football League clubs
South Wales Senior League clubs
Mid Wales Football League clubs
Association football clubs established in 1946
1946 establishments in Wales
Brecon
Mid Wales South League clubs
Ardal Leagues clubs